Quercus lineata is a species of Quercus (oak) in the beech family Fagaceae, belonging to subgenus Cerris, section Cyclobalanopsis. It was first described by Carl Ludwig von Blume.

Range and habitat
Quercus lineata is native from Assam and Bangladesh through Indochina to Hainan, Borneo, Peninsular Malaysia, Sumatra, and Java.

Quercus lineata is native to humid montane forests between 500 and 2,200 metres elevation. It is typically found on sandy or basic soils.

Varieties
According to Tropicos a number of varieties exist, including:

Quercus lineata var. fargesii (Franch.) Skan
Quercus lineata var. grandifolia Skan
Quercus lineata var. heterochroa Miq.
Quercus lineata var. hilldebrandii Hook.f.
Quercus lineata var. lobbii Hook.f. & Thomson ex Wenz.
Quercus lineata var. macrophylla Seemen
Quercus lineata var. merkusii (Endl.) Wenz.
Quercus lineata var. oxyodon (Miq.) Wenz.
Quercus lineata var. oxyrhyncha (Miq.) Seem.
Quercus lineata var. thomsoniana (A.DC.) Wenz.

Taxonomy
Quercus lineata was initially described by Blume and published in Bijdragen tot de flora van Nederlandsch Indië (tr. Contributions to the flora of the Dutch East Indies) 10: 523–524. 1825.

References

lineata
Flora of Assam (region)
Flora of Bangladesh
Flora of Borneo
Flora of Hainan
Flora of Java
Flora of Laos
Flora of Malaya
Flora of Myanmar
Flora of Sumatra
Flora of Thailand
Flora of Vietnam
Flora of the Borneo montane rain forests
Plants described in 1826